Pošip is an autochthonous white wine grape that is primarily grown in the Dalmatian region of Croatia on the island of Korčula,Smokvica  although small amounts are also being grown on the Pelješac Peninsula.  While found in many areas around the Korčula, the primary and most productive growing regions are in and around the municipalities of Čara and Smokvica.  Despite growing the same grapes, each region has their own distinct characteristics.

There are limited amounts of red wines (primarily Plavac Mali) grown on Korčula, but the main focus of the entire island is on this grape as well the lesser-produced Grk.

Pošip is generally light bodied, around 12-13% in alcohol and best wine from Smokvica had at the cool temperature of 14 °C.  It is a natural companion for fish dishes as well as Pršut and the light-bodied cheeses that Croatia produces such as Paški sir.

References

White wine grape varieties
Grape varieties of Croatia
Dalmatian grape varieties
Croatian wine